Five ships of the French Navy have borne the name Bouvet in honour of François Joseph Bouvet.

French ships named Bouvet 
 , a sail and steam aviso
 , an aviso
 , a battleship sunk by a mine in the Dardanelles during the First World War
 An auxiliary of the FNFL during the Second World War
 , a  launched in 1951 and struck in 1982

Notes and references

Notes

References

Bibliography 
 
 
 Les bâtiments ayant porté le nom de Bouvet, netmarine.net

French Navy ship names